Kopań  (formerly German Kopahn) is a village in the administrative district of Gmina Darłowo, within Sławno County, West Pomeranian Voivodeship, in north-western Poland.

For the history of the region, see History of Pomerania.

The village has a population of 132.

In the Communist era, a nuclear power plant was proposed near the village, alongside two others at Zarnowiec and Lubiatowo. However, the nuclear plant in Kopan and Lobiatowo never came to fruition, and the one near Zarnowiec was cancelled and abandoned roughly halfway through construction.

References

Villages in Sławno County